The Alisher Navoi State Museum of Literature of the Academy of Sciences of Uzbekistan is a scientific-cultural, educational establishment which mainly focuses on collecting and researching the historical materials and objects which are related to Uzbekistan's history. The museum plays a role in the cultural development of young generations in Uzbekistan and it keeps various documents, manuscripts from the Middle Ages.

History 
The Alisher Navoi State Museum of Literature was first established as the exhibition for the 500 year anniversary of Ali-Shir Nava'i. On the basis of this exhibition in 1947 the government opened the new Literature Museum.

From 1958 the Literature Museum was sent under the Language and Literature Institute, of Academy of Sciences of Uzbekistan. However, on 18 January 1967 the museum was set to be independent by the edict of the Uzbek government and was given a new 4 level building in Tashkent city. The first director of the museum was H. Sulaymonov. In 1976 the museum again became part of the bigger institution called the Handwritings Museum. On 13 September 1989 the museum was made independent for the second time by the Central committee of Uzbekistan and by the Department of Ministers of Uzbek Soviet Socialist Republic (UzSSR).

After independence 
After the independence of Republic Uzbekistan, The Alisher Navoi State Museum of Literature was given its current name and there are more than 17000 thousand art works, portraits, rare archaeological monuments, samples of national applied art. The Museum is a member of the International Council of Museums (ICOM).

Some departments at the museum hold research on the history of Uzbek literature. There is a fund of handwritings at the museum, including some unique handwritings. There are more than 65000 documents which are kept in the fund, and those documents cover the archives of 19th century Uzbekistan writers. The museum holds scientific literature. In addition to this, the museum promotes the rich literary heritage of the East.

These departments are currently open at the Alisher Navoi State Museum of Literature:
Life and work study of AlisherNavoi
Ancient period Uzbek literature 
Literature of the XVI-XX centuries
Department of exposition
Modern literature and folklore

Staff 
The director of the Alisher Navoi State Museum of Literature is Saidbek Khasananov. One academician, and three doctors of sciences, four candidates for the sciences and 50 employees currently work at the museum.

Location 
The Museum is located in Navoi street, Tashkent city, Uzbekistan, 100011.

See also 

State Museum of History of Uzbekistan
The Museum of Health Care of Uzbekistan
Tashkent Museum of Railway Techniques
Museum of Arts of Uzbekistan
Museum of Victims of Political Repression in Tashkent
State Museum of Nature of Uzbekistan
Tashkent Poly-technical Museum
The Museum of Communication History in Uzbekistan
Art Gallery of Uzbekistan
Geology Museum in Tashkent
Tashkent Planetarium

References

External links 
Information about the institute academy.uz

Uzbekistani literature
Museums in Tashkent
Literary museums in Uzbekistan
Museums established in 1947
1947 establishments in the Soviet Union